A Bescherelle is a French language grammar reference book best known for its verb conjugations volumes. It is named in honour of the 19th-century French lexicographer and grammarian Louis-Nicolas Bescherelle (and perhaps his brother Henri Bescherelle). It is often used as a general term, but the "Collection Bescherelle" is in fact a brand name, used by Éditions Hatier for Metropolitan French, and also by Éditions Hurtubise for Canadian French.

Overview
The series is made up of three volumes dealing with various aspects of French grammar. Each of the three volumes uses example sentences to demonstrate proper French grammar. The term Bescherelle is often used to refer to the first book, L'art de conjuguer.

L'art de conjuguer (The Art of Conjugation) presents the conjugation of every type of verb in the French language in every verb tense. Each verb type is numbered so that multiple verbs with identical conjugation (such as chanter and enchanter) can be grouped under one basic verb of that type. L'art de conjuguer also offers all of the rules concerning grammar within verb conjugation as well as a detailed guide on the purpose of each verb tense. The most recent versions cover 12,000 verbs in 95 conjugation tables. 

The second volume, L'orthographe pour tous (Spelling for All) explains how to convert spoken sounds in French into writing. The third volume, Grammaire pour tous (Grammar for All) is a guide on French syntax, sentence structure, the application of proper grammar to sentences, and punctuation. 

Bescherelles (L'art de conjuguer in particular) are commonly used in French immersion schools, and it is often required for students to purchase one for class.

Bescherelles also exist on the grammars of German, English, Spanish, Italian, Portuguese, Arabic and Latin although they are less popular than that of the original French. Similarly, there are not only editions written for students whose first language is the subject, but there are also editions for students with a grounding in another language. Students can choose an edition to use their existing or new language to read about the new one.

Although the word Bescherelle has the typically feminine ending -elle, it is a masculine noun in French (le Bescherelle).

There is an iPhone and iPad application named Bescherelle ‐ Le conjugueur (The Conjugator), which contains all of the French language verbs and conjugations. It was published by the two French publishers: Anuman Interactive and Hatier.

References

External links
Official site
Open source XML database of French verb conjugation rules

French grammar
Style guides
Editorial collections